Gulfam is an album of the Indian singer and Ghazal composer Hariharan, released in the year 1994 by Indian label Venus. It was composed and sung by Hariharan.

This album not only got Hariharan Double Platinum in Sales but also the Channel V instituted Diva Award for the Best Album Of the Year.

Track listing
All music composed by Hariharan.

References

Hariharan (singer) albums
1994 albums